The Lohner M was a reconnaissance flying boat produced in Austria-Hungary during World War I.

Design
The Lohner M was a biplane flying boat with slightly backswept wings and the pilot and observer sat side-by-side in the cockpit. One version of the Type M, the "MkN", was designed as a mine-spotting plane.

Variants
M(M1) Initial production aircraft powered by  Hiero 4-cylinder water-cooled in-line piston engine; 4 delivered to KuK Kriegsmarine (E.17 to E.21).
Mn(M2) Second production batch; 5 delivered to KuK Kriegsmarine (E.33 to E.38).
MkA single M powered by  Mercedes D.I (M.31)
Mkn

Operational history
The Type Ms patrolled the Adriatic Sea from 1914 until spring 1915, but they were supplanted by the Lohner Type L. After 1915, the Type Ms were consigned to second-line duties, but remained in service until 1917.

Operators

Austro-Hungarian Navy

Specifications (M E.17 to E.21)

See also

References

1910s Austro-Hungarian military reconnaissance aircraft
M
Flying boats
Military aircraft of World War I
Biplanes
Single-engined pusher aircraft
Aircraft first flown in 1914